Nasrollah Beyglu (also Romanized as Naşrollāh Beyglū) is a village in Pain Barzand Rural District, Anguti District, Germi County, Ardabil Province, Iran. At the 2006 census, its population was 417, in 96 families.

References 

Towns and villages in Germi County